Interstate 85 (I-85) is an Interstate Highway that runs from Montgomery, Alabama, to Petersburg, Virginia. In North Carolina, I-85 travels  from the South Carolina state line near Grover, North Carolina, to the Virginia state line near Wise. Despite being signed north–south, I-85 physically travels in a southwest–northeast direction across the state. The Interstate Highway connects the three most populous metropolitan areas of North Carolina: the Charlotte metropolitan area, Piedmont Triad, and Research Triangle, as well as nine of the 20 largest municipalities in the state. Outside of North Carolina, I-85 connects the state with Richmond, Virginia, to the north and Upstate South Carolina and Atlanta, Georgia, to the south. I-85 parallels several US Highways including US Highway 29 (US 29) between South Carolina and Greensboro, US 70 between Greensboro and Durham, US 15 between Durham and Oxford, and US 1 between Henderson and Virginia.

Route description

I-85 enters the state from Cherokee County, South Carolina near Grover in Cleveland County, an outer suburb of the Charlotte metropolitan area. After only a few miles, the highway enters Gaston County. Near Kings Mountain, I-85 turns from a northeast trajectory to an eastward one and goes through Gastonia, where it widens from four to six lanes. It stays at six lanes until it reaches Belmont, where the highway widens again to eight lanes.

The highway crosses the Catawba River as it enters Mecklenburg County, then interchanges with I-485 as it passes north of Charlotte Douglas International Airport. After crossing I-485, it turns northeastward again, bypassing Uptown Charlotte to the west and north. While the route does not enter uptown, several exits do provide access to the area. An interchange with I-77 north of uptown provides direct freeway access. The route through Charlotte traverses the northern portion of the city and is more suburban than urban in character, with light industry such as truck terminals, warehouses, small manufacturing facilities, and small office parks lining the highway. It also passes by the University City area and the University of North Carolina at Charlotte.

North of Charlotte, I-85 interchanges with I-485 a second time as it continues northeastward into Cabarrus County. In Concord, it passes through a dense commercial district and provides access to both Concord Mills shopping mall and Charlotte Motor Speedway, afterward passing south and east of Kannapolis. , the highway between exit 58 (near Concord) and exit 68 near the Rowan County town of China Grove is being rebuilt and expanded from four lanes total (two in each direction) with no shoulders. When complete, the route will have eight total lanes through to its junction with I-85 Business (I-85 Bus) south of Lexington.

Between exits 96 and 102, the northbound and southbound lanes switch places. The southbound lane crosses over the northbound lane just before the northbound lane passes over a small bridge over Hamby Creek. East of the northbound overpass and southbound underpass with Squire Bowers Road, a pair of rest areas which contain the North Carolina Vietnam Veterans Memorial Park are entered from the right but are still in the median. Only after the underpasses beneath Johnsontown Road does the northbound lane run over the southbound one returning to its proper location.

I-85 bypasses High Point and also largely bypasses Greensboro. Up until February 2004, I-85 went through the heart of Greensboro and joined I-40 near downtown. Today, I-85 is routed along the Greensboro Urban Loop and meets I-40 east of downtown. Its former route is now known as I-85 Bus.

I-85 and I-40 remain joined as they continue eastward to the Research Triangle region, anchored by the cities of Chapel Hill, Durham, and Raleigh. West of Durham near Hillsborough, the two highways split, with I-40 heading southeast through Chapel Hill, Durham, and Raleigh while I-85 continues eastward through Durham, then northeastward as it exits the city. In between Greensboro and Durham, I-85/I-40 is eight lanes wide even through the more suburban stretches. Soon after the I-40/I-85 split, it narrows back down to four lanes through Orange County, where the highway still retains much of its original design, including substandard ramps at exits 164, 165, and 170. Once I-85 hits Durham, it temporarily widens to 10 lanes. It takes on a more suburban character once it leaves Durham and then heads into rural areas, bypassing Oxford and Henderson before crossing into Mecklenburg County, Virginia.

Dedicated and memorial names

I-85 in North Carolina features a few dedicated or memorialized stretches of freeway.

 Blue Star Memorial Highway: The official North Carolina honorary name of I-85 throughout the state that was approved on May 5, 1967.
 Senator Marshall Arthur Rauch Highway: The official North Carolina name of I-85 through Gaston County that was approved on October 3, 1997.
 William James Pharr Bridge: The official North Carolina name of the bridge over the South Fork River on I-85 in Gaston County that was approved on August 5, 1994.
 Cameron Morrison Bridge: The official North Carolina name of the bridge over the Catawba River on I-85 between Gaston and Mecklenburg counties that was approved on March 11, 1983. It is named in honor of Cameron A. Morrison, known as the Good Roads Governor.
 Julius Chambers Highway: The official North Carolina name of I-85 between I-77/US 21 and the I-85 Connector, in Charlotte. It is named in honor of Julius L. Chambers, who was a lawyer, civil rights leader, and educator, and was dedicated on May 24, 2018.
 Jeff Gordon Expressway: The official North Carolina name of I-85 from the Charlotte city limit to the Mecklenburg/Cabarrus county line in Northeast Mecklenburg County. It is named in honor of NASCAR driver Jeff Gordon and was dedicated on May 25, 2012.
 Yadkin River Veterans Memorial Bridge: The official North Carolina name of the bridge over the Yadkin River on I-85 between Rowan and Davidson counties that was approved on May 11, 2011.
 Bob Timberlake Freeway: The official North Carolina name of I-85 from exit 92 to exit 96 in Davidson County.
 Richard Childress Freeway: The official North Carolina name of I-85 from exit 96 to exit 102 in  Davidson County.
 Congressman J. Howard Coble Highway: The official North Carolina name of I-85 from I-40 to Alamance Church Road in Guilford County that was approved on December 1, 2016. It is named in honor of Representative Howard Coble, who represented North Carolina's 6th congressional district for 30 years.
 Dr. John H. Franklin Highway: The official North Carolina name of I-85/US 70, between Cole Mill Road (exit 173) and US 70 (exit 178), in Durham. It is named in honor of John Hope Franklin, an American historian and recipient of the Presidential Medal of Freedom.

History

Parts of I-85 were already constructed before federal aid was available in the 1950s, as the state had been constructing sections of the Interstate Highway System since 1949. The Lexington Bypass north of Lexington—which at the time was signed US 29 and US 70—is now a part of I-85 Bus. This was part of an  expressway completed in 1955 between Lexington and Hillsborough.

Construction on the bridge started in 1955 (this date is shown on a plaque, and most sources have used the date), but the lanes were not as wide as federal standards required, and the road had a sharp curve north of the bridge. Both of these characteristics saved money.

The Federal-Aid Highway Act of 1956 provided for 90-percent federal funding of highways that would become part of the Interstate Highway System, and the North Carolina Highway Commission used the funds to build the rest of the highway, which opened as I-85 in 1958. The bridge, finished a year earlier, was grandfathered despite not meeting standards.

Another section of I-85 opened to traffic on September 9, 1958, when an  stretch in Mecklenburg County was opened.

The year 1960 saw several sections of the highway open to traffic:

 An  section of I-85 between Henderson and the Virginia border as well as a  section between Greensboro and western Durham opened to traffic.
 A  portion of US 29/US 70 between Salisbury and Greensboro was incorporated into I-85 when further grade separations and access control were completed.
 A  segment of I-85 known as the "Charlotte Bypass" in Charlotte.
 A  segment between Greensboro and Whitsett.

By 1965, I-85 from the South Carolina border to Charlotte was complete, while it took until 1970 for the section between Charlotte and Durham to be completed. However, the "Temporary 85" designation would remain on the segment between Lexington and Greensboro until 1984 because there were too many access roads. That year, a new six-lane section opened, resulting in the "Temporary 85" designation to be dropped.

Since its completion, many widening projects have been undertaken on I-85, particularly along the stretch of highway between Gastonia and Durham. By 1988, widening I-85 to six lanes from Greensboro to Burlington was being considered. The plan was later changed to eight lanes. The $175-million (equivalent to $ in ) project began in 1989. With the opening of a  section in Alamance County on November 23, 1994,  of I-85/I-40 were eight lanes. An additional  were to be ready by 1996, giving the Interstate eight lanes all the way to where I-40 turned southward at Hillsborough.

In addition, I-85 was relocated in 2004, south of Greensboro, forming part of the Greensboro Urban Loop, allowing through traffic to bypass that city's downtown area. Between 2004 and 2008, I-85 was widened to eight lanes around Salisbury.

The I-85 Corridor Improvement Project, located in Rowan and Davidson counties, was a two-phase project to replace the narrow bridge over the Yadkin River and widen the freeway from four to eight lanes. In the first phase, all traffic from the old bridge moved to a new $201-million (equivalent to $ in ) bridge in August 2012. On March 9, 2013, all eight lanes of the I-85 bridge opened to the public. The project finished eight months ahead of schedule and $44 million (equivalent to $ in ) under budget.

From May 2010 through April 2014, I-85 was widened from four to eight lanes between exit 49 (near Charlotte Motor Speedway and Concord Mills) and exit 55.

Current projects 

Following the completion of the widening of I-85 between exits 49 and 55, a new project was started to widen I-85 from exit 55 (NC 73) in Concord, Cabarrus County northward to exit 68 (NC 152) in China Grove, Rowan County. Like the prior project, I-85 is being doubled in capacity, expanding from two travel lanes in each direction to four travel lanes in each direction. The project is now complete as of May 2021. The first phase (from exit 55 to exit 63) began in early 2014, and the second phase (from exit 63 to exit 68) began in early 2017. Construction is scheduled to be completed by December 2017. When finished, that will leave I-85 in North Carolina with at least six lanes of highway between exits 10 (US 29 north/US 74—Kings Mountain and Shelby) and 164 (I-40 in Hillsborough).

Exit list

Related routes
There are four auxiliary routes and one business loop in the state. I-285 runs concurrently with US 52 connecting I-85 to I-40 in the Winston-Salem metropolitan area. I-485 forms a beltway around Charlotte, serving as a bypass for I-85 and I-77. I-785 serves as a spur route, forming a portion of the eastern part of the Greensboro Urban Loop. I-885 connects I-85 to I-40 in the Durham area.

I-85 Bus. is a partial controlled-access highway, bypassing Lexington, Thomasville, and High Point and also connecting the cities to Greensboro.

See also

 Catawba River
 Charlotte Motor Speedway
 Concord Mills
 Crowders Mountain State Park
 Eno River State Park
 Falls Lake
 Haw River
 Kerr Lake
 Kings Mountain National Military Park
 Lake Wylie
 Northgate Mall
 U.S. National Whitewater Center
 Yadkin River

References

External links

I-85 Corridor Improvement Project

85
 North Carolina
Transportation in Charlotte, North Carolina
Transportation in Durham, North Carolina
Transportation in Greensboro, North Carolina
Transportation in Cleveland County, North Carolina
Transportation in Gaston County, North Carolina
Transportation in Mecklenburg County, North Carolina
Transportation in Cabarrus County, North Carolina
Transportation in Rowan County, North Carolina
Transportation in Davidson County, North Carolina
Transportation in Randolph County, North Carolina
Transportation in Guilford County, North Carolina
Transportation in Alamance County, North Carolina
Transportation in Orange County, North Carolina
Transportation in Durham County, North Carolina
Transportation in Granville County, North Carolina
Transportation in Vance County, North Carolina
Transportation in Warren County, North Carolina
Jeff Gordon